This is a list of works about Islamic apologetics (Kalam) .

General 

Zafar, Harris. Demystifying Islam: Tackling the Tough Questions. Lanham: Rowman & Littlefield Publishers, 2017.
Alsayyid, Ahmad Yusuf. Misconceptions and Refutations. Osoul Center, 2019.
Mawdudi, Abul A'la. Human Rights in Islam. Leicester: The Islamic Foundation. .
Qutb, Muhammad. Islam: The Misunderstood Religion. India: Markazi Maktaba Islami Publishers, 2004.
Reeves, Minou, and P. J. Stewart. Muhammad in Europe: a Thousand Years of Western Myth-Making. Reading: Garnet, 2016.
Arnold, Thomas Walker. The Preaching of Islam: A History of the Propagation of the Muslim Faith. India: Adam Publishers & Distributors, 2002.
Hawramani, Ikram. An Intelligent Person's Guide to Understanding Islam and Muslims: What the West Misunderstands about Culture, Politics, Sexuality, Women and Rationality in Islamic Societies. Independently Published, 2018.
Naik, Zakir. Answers to Non-Muslims' Common Questions about Islam. India: Islami Kitab Ghar, 2012.
Said, Edward. Covering Islam: how the media and the experts determine how we see the rest of the world. New York: Random House. .
Starr, S. Frederick. Xinjiang: China's Muslim Borderland. London: Routledge, 2015.
Aly, Waleed. People Like Us. Pan Macmillan, 2007. .
Lyons, Jonathan. Islam Through Western Eyes: From the Crusades to the War on Terrorism. United States: Columbia University Press, 2014.
Attar, Samar. The Vital Roots of European Enlightenment: Ibn Tufayl's Influence on Modern Western Thought. United States: Lexington Books, 2007.
Sheikh, Zia U.. Islam: Silencing the Critics. United States: Createspace Independent Pub, 2012.
Gulen, Fethullah. Questions And Answers About Islam. United States: Tughra Books, 2007.
Murata, Sachiko. Chittick, William. Vision of Islam. Paragon House, 1994. 
Nasr, Seyyed Hossein. The Heart of Islam: Enduring Values for Humanity. HarperCollins, 2004.

Comparative Religion 

 Naik, Zakir. The Concept of God in Major Religions. Saudi Arabia: Darussalam, 2007.

Christianity 

 Ibn Taymiyah, Al-Jawāb al-Ṣaḥīḥ li-man baddala dīn al-Masīh (Literally, "The Correct Response to those who have Corrupted the Deen (Religion) of the Messiah"; A Muslim theologian's response to Christianity) – Seven Volumes. In modern critical editions it amounts to more than 2000 pages.
 Kairanawi, Rahmatullah. Izhar ul-Haqq (The Truth Revealed) Translated by Muhammad Wali Razi. Ta-Ha Publishers Ltd. 1 Wynne Road, London. 
Deedat, Ahmed. The Choice: Islam & Christianity. India: Adam Publishers & Distributors, 2012.
Deedat, Ahmed. Crucifixion or Cruci-Fiction. Pakistan: Islamic Propagation Centre International, 1984.
Deedat, Ahmed. What the Bible Says About Muhammad (PBUH). Kuwait: Kazi Publications, 1982.
Zakaria, Abu. JESUS: Man, Messenger, Messiah iERA, 2017. . 
Deedat, Ahmed. Is the Bible God's Word?. India: Islamic Propagation Centre, 1981.

Atheism 

 Tzortzis, Hamza Andreas. The Divine Reality: God, Islam and the Mirage of Atheism. Revised. San Clemente: FB Publishing, 2018.
 Ahmad, Saiyad Fareed, and Saiyad Salahuddin Ahmad. God, Islam & the Skeptic Mind: a Study on Faith, Science, Religious Diversity, Ethics, and Evil. North Charleston, SC: CreateSpace, 2014. 
 Green, A.R. Man in the Red Underpants. onereason 
Maḥmūd, Muṣṭafá. Dialogue with an Atheist. United Kingdom: Dar Al Taqwa, 1994.
Zakaria, Abu. The Eternal Challenge: A Journey Through The Miraculous Qur’an. onereason, 2015. .
Malik, Shoaib Ahmed. Atheism and Islam: A Contemporary Discourse Abu Dhabi: Kalam Research & Media, 2018. 
Al-Shehri, Abdullah S. The Only Way Out: A Guide for Truth Seekers. 2010.

Hinduism 

 Naik, Zakir. Similarities Between Hinduism & Islam. India: Adam Publishers & Distributors, 2007.

Philosophy and Theology 

 al-Ghazālī, Abu Hamid. The Incoherence of the Philosophers (Tr. Marmura, Michael E. Utah: Brigham Young University Press. )
 al-Juwainī, ʻAbd-al-Malik Ibn-ʻAbdallāh. A Guide to Conclusive Proofs for the Principles of Belief (Kitāb Al-irshād ilā qawātiʻ Al-Adilla fī uṣūl Al-iʻtiqād). Translated by Paul E. Walker. Reading: Garnet, 2001.
al-Uthaimeen, Shaikh Muhammad ibn Saleh. Are We Forced or do we have Free Will?  Quran Sunnah Educational Programs.

Qur'an 

 Draz, Muhammad Abdullah, Salahi, Adil. The Qur'an: An Eternal Challenge. Kube Publishing Limited. 
Ameri, Sami. Hunting for the word of God. Academic Research Initiative for Comparative Religion, 2017.
Ali, Muhammad Mohar. The Qurʼân and the Orientalists: An Examination of Their Main Theories and Assumptions. United Kingdom: Jamʻiyat ʼIhyaaʼ Minhaaj al-Sunnah, 2004.
Saeh, Bassam. The Miraculous Language of the Qur'an: Evidence of Divine Origin. United Kingdom: International Institute of Islamic Thought, 2015.
Aʻẓamī, Muḥammad Muṣṭafá. The History of the Qur'ānic Text: From Revelation to Compilation: a Comparative Study with the Old and New Testaments. United Kingdom: UK Islamic Academy, 2003.
Taslaman, Caner. The Quran: Unchallengeable Miracle. Turkey: Nettleberry/Çitlembik Publications, 2006.
Al-Imam, Ahmad Ali. Variant Readings Of The Quran: A Critical Study Of Their Historical And Linguistic Origins. International Institute of Islamic Thought, 2006.
El-Awa, Salwa. Textual Relations in the Quran: Relevance, Coherence and Structure. Routledge, 2006.
Farrin, Raymond. Structure and Qur'anic Interpretation: a Study of Symmetry and Coherence in Islam's Holy Text. White Cloud Press, 2014.

Muhammad 

 Ali, Muhammad Mohar. Sîrat Al-Nabî and the Orientalists. King Fahd Complex for the Printing of the Holy Qur'an, 2018.
 Zayed, Moustafa. The Lies about Muhammad: An Answer to the Robert Spencer Book "The Truth about Muhammad". United States: Createspace Independent Pub, 2010.
Armstrong, Karen. Muhammad: A Biography of the Prophet. United States: HarperCollins, 1993.
Vidyarthi, Abdul. Mohammad in World Scriptures. India: Adam Publishers & Distributors, 1999.
Cole, Juan. Muhammad: Prophet of Peace Amid the Clash of Empires. United States: Bold Type Books, 2018
Lings, Martin. Muhammad: His Life Based on the Earliest Sources. United Kingdom: Islamic Texts Society, 1983..

Hadith 

 Jonathan A. C. Brown, Misquoting Muhammad: The Challenge and Choices of Interpreting the Prophet's Legacy Oneworld, 2015.

History 

 Al-Djazairi, S. E. The Myth of Muslim Barbarism and Its Aims. Manchester: Bayt Al-Hikma Press, 2007. 
 al-Djazairi, S. E. The Hidden Debt to Islamic Civilisation. MSBN Books, 2018. 
Graham, Mark A. How Islam Created the Modern World. United States: Amana Publications, 2006.
Morgan, Michael Hamilton. Lost History: The Enduring Legacy of Muslim Scientists, Thinkers, and Artists. Philippines: National Geographic, 2008.
Lyons, Jonathan. The House of Wisdom: How the Arabs Transformed Western Civilization. United Kingdom: Bloomsbury USA, 2010.
Nadvī, Abulḥasan ʻAlī. Saviours of Islamic Spirit. United States: White Thread Press, 2015.
Alkhateeb, Firas. Lost Islamic History: Reclaiming Muslim Civilisation from the Past Oxford University Press, 2017.
Murphy, Tim-Wallace. What Islam Did For Us: Understanding Islam's contribution to Western Civilization.  Watkins, 2006.
Al-Khalili, Jim. The House of Wisdom: How Arabic Science Saved Ancient Knowledge and Gave Us the Renaissance. Penguin Press, 2011

Women 

 Nadwī, Muḥammad Akram. Al-Muhaddithat: The Women Scholars in Islam. United Kingdom: Interface Publications, 2013.
Bewley, Aisha. Islam: The Empowering of Women. Ta-Ha, 1999. 
Murata, Sachiko. The Tao of Islam: A Sourcebook on Gender Relationships in Islamic Thought. State University of New York Press, 1992. 
Bullock, Katherine. Rethinking Muslim Women and the Veil: Challenging Historical & Modern Stereotypes. International Institute of Islamic Thought, 2002.

Islamic Law 

 Al-Bouti, Muhammad Sa’id. Islamic Legal Punishments & The Zeitgeist. 2020. . 
Aʻẓamī, Muḥammad Muṣṭafá. On Schacht's Origins of Muhammadan Jurisprudence. United Kingdom: Oxford Centre for Islamic Studies, 1996.
Ahmed, Rumee. Sharia Compliant: A User's Guide to Hacking Islamic Law. United States: Stanford University Press, 2018..
Ahmed, Rumee. Narratives of Islamic Legal Theory OUP Oxford, 2012. 
Emon, Anver. Religious Pluralism and Islamic Law: Dhimmis and Others in the Empire of Law. OUP Oxford, 2012.

Science 

 Bucaille, Maurice. The Bible, the Quran & Science. New Delhi: Adam Publishers & Distributors, 2012. 
 Naik, Zakir. The Qur'an & Modern Science: Compatible or Incompatible?. India: Darussalam, 2007.
Guessoum, Nidhal. Islam's Quantum Question: Reconciling Muslim Tradition and Modern Science. United Kingdom: Bloomsbury Publishing, 2010.
Tzortzis, Hamza Andreas. Embryology in the Quran onereason.

Slavery 

Brown, Jonathan A.C.. Slavery and Islam. United Kingdom: Oneworld Publications, 2020.
Diouf, Sylviane A. Servants of Allah: African Muslims Enslaved in the Americas NYU Press, 1998.

Terrorism and Extremism 

 Ridley, Yvonne. In the Hands of the Taliban. United Kingdom: Pavilion Books, 2014.
Yahya, Harun. No Room for Terrorism in Islam. India: Adam Publishers & Distributors, 2004.
Abou El Fadl, Khaled M. The Great Theft: Wrestling Islam from the Extremists HarperOne, 2009.
al-Yaʻqūbī, Muḥammad. Refuting ISIS: Destroying Its Religious Foundations and Proving That It Has Strayed from Islam and That Fighting It Is an Obligation. Herndon, VA: Sacred Knowledge, 2016.

By region

West (Europe and America) 

Baran, Zeyno., Tuohy, Emmet. Citizen Islam: The Future of Muslim Integration in the West. United Kingdom: Bloomsbury Publishing, 2011.
Izetbegović, Alija. Islam Between East and West. United States: American Trust Publications, 1993.
Ramadan, Tariq. Islam, the West and the Challenges of Modernity. United Kingdom: Kube Publishing Limited, 2009.
Ramadan, Tariq. To Be a European Muslim. United Kingdom: Kube Publishing Limited, 2013.
Nadwi, Abul Hasan Ali. Western Civilisation: Islam and Muslims. Academy of Islamic Research and Publications, Lucknow, 1979.
Green, Todd H. The Fear of Islam: An Introduction to Islamophobia in the West Augsburg: Fortress Publishers, 2019.

Politics 

 Quṭb, Sayyid. Milestones. India: Islamic Book Service, 2003.

Psychology 

 Utz, Aisha. Psychology from the Islamic Perspective. Saudi Arabia: International Islamic Publishing House, 2011.
 Benslama, Fethi, Bononno, Robert. Psychoanalysis and the challenge of Islam. United Kingdom: University of Minnesota Press, 2009.

Nature 

 Abdul-Matin, Ibrahim. Green Deen: What Islam Teaches about Protecting the Planet. United States: Berrett-Koehler Publishers, 2010.

Communism 

 Yahya, Harun. Communism in Ambush. Turkey: Global Pub., 2003.

Autobiographical 

 Asad, Muhammad. The Road to Mecca. Malaysia: Islamic Book Trust, 1996.
 Linda iLham Barto. Memoirs of a Hillbilly Muslim. United States: Dog Ear Publishing, LLC, 2011.
Cole, Donald Powell. Road to Islam: From Texas to Saudi Arabia and Egypt. Egypt: Dar Alraya Top, 2009.
al-Ghazali, Abu Hamid Muhammad. Deliverance from Error: An Annotated Translation of Al-Munqidh Min Al Dalal and Other Relevant Works of Al-Ghazali. Translator: McCarthy, Richard Joseph. United Kingdom: Fons Vitae, 1999.

Literature and plays 

 Tufayl, Ibn. Ibn Tufayl's Hayy Ibn Yaqzan: A Philosophical Tale. Translator: Lenn Evan Goodman, University of Chicago Press, 2015.
 Aboulela, Leila. Minaret. United Kingdom: Bloomsbury Publishing, 2015.

Intra-Islam 

 al-Ghazālī, Abu Hamid. The Revival of the Religious Sciences (Tr. Fazl ul Kareem, Pakistan: Darul Ishat)
 ibn al-Jawzi, A Great Collection of Fabricated Traditions.
 Iqbal, Muhammad. The Reconstruction of Religious Thought in Islam Kitab Bhavan, 2000. .
 al-Ghazali, Zainab. Return of the Pharaoh. The Islamic Foundation.
Khan, Nouman Ali. Revive Your Heart: Putting Life in Perspective. United Kingdom: Kube Publishing Limited, 2017.

See also 
 Bibliography of books critical of Christianity
 Bibliography of books critical of Islam
 Bibliography of books critical of Judaism
 Bibliography of books critical of Mormonism
 Bibliography of books critical of Scientology
 List of apologetic works
 List of Christian apologetic works

References 

Islam